The Best Male Soccer Player ESPY Award was presented annually to the male soccer (association football) player adjudged to be the best in a given calendar year amongst those contesting the sport on the professional or international level.  The award, along with the Best Female Soccer Player ESPY Award, evolved from the Best Soccer Player ESPY Award, which was awarded in 2000 and 2001, and the latter once more absorbed the gender-specific awards in 2005.

During the award's three years, the voting panel comprised variously fans, who participated through Internet balloting; sportswriters and broadcasters, sports executives, and retired sportspersons, termed collectively experts; and ESPN personalities.  The ESPY Awards ceremony was conducted in June and awards conferred reflected performance and achievement over the twelve months previous to presentation.

List of winners

See also
FIFA World Player of the Year
FIFA World Cup awards
African Footballer of the Year
Asian Footballer of the Year
European Footballer of the Year
Oceania Footballer of the Year
South American Footballer of the Year

Notes

References

ESPY Awards
American soccer trophies and awards
Awards established in 2002
Awards disestablished in 2004
2002 establishments in the United States